Yamakinkarudu is a 1982 Indian Telugu-language action film directed by Raj Bharat and produced by Allu Aravind. This film stars Chiranjeevi, Raadhika, and Sarath Babu. The screenplay was mainly adapted from the 1979 film Dirty Harry and Mad Max. The movie grossed Rs.2.5 million in its opening week.

Plot 
Vijay (Chiranjeevi) and Kishore (Sarath Babu) are childhood friends and both work in police department. They put a goon called Jackal behind bars and he vows revenge on them before going to jail. Kishore's sister (Raadhika) is in love with vijay. They get married and have a kid. Jackal escapes from jail and kills Kishore. Now its Vijay's turn to bring Jackal and his gang to justice and put an end to their atrocities.

Cast 
Chiranjeevi ....  Vijay
Raadhika ....  Radha
Kaikala Satyanarayana
Sarath Babu ....  Kishore
Jaggayya
Sudarshan Dhir ....  Jackal
Silk Smitha

Crew 
Director: Raj Bharat
Producer: Allu Aravind
Music: K. Chakravarthy
Playback singers: S.P. Balasubramaniam  P. Susheela  S. Janaki

References

External links 
 

1980s Telugu-language films
1982 films
Films scored by K. Chakravarthy
Geetha Arts films
Indian remakes of foreign films